Waterloo High School may refer to:

Waterloo High School (Alabama), Waterloo, Alabama, US
Waterloo High School (Illinois), Waterloo, Illinois, US
Waterloo High School (New York), Waterloo, New York, US
Waterloo High School (Ohio), Atwater, Ohio, US
Waterloo High School (Wisconsin), Waterloo, Wisconsin, US
Waterloo East High School, Waterloo, Iowa, US
Waterloo West High School, Waterloo, Iowa, US